The spouse of the governor of Minnesota is given an honorary position, styled as First Lady or First Gentleman of the State of
Minnesota. To date there have been no female governors of the State of Minnesota, and all first spouses have been first ladies.

The current first lady is Gwen Walz, wife of Governor Tim Walz.

See also
List of governors of Minnesota

References

First Ladies and Gentlemen of Minnesota
Lists of people from Minnesota
Lists of spouses